The abbreviation CVUSD can apply to multiple United States school districts:
Chino Valley Unified School District (disambiguation), multiple districts
Camp Verde Unified School District
Castro Valley Unified School District
Coachella Valley Unified School District
Conejo Valley Unified School District
Covina-Valley Unified School District